This is a listing of places in Middlesex County in the U.S. state of Massachusetts that are listed in the National Register of Historic Places.  With more than 1,300 listings, the county has more listings than any other county in the United States.


Cities and towns listed separately
The following Middlesex County cities and towns have large numbers of sites listed in the National Register of Historic Places.  Lists of their sites are on separate pages, linked below.

Other municipalities

|}

Former listings

|}

References

 
Middlesex